

17th century

1650 
 United Kingdom – Whickham, County Durham. Two boys die when they are run over by a wagon on a wooden coal train way. While such tramway accidents are not generally listed as rail accidents (note the lack of accidents listed for the next 163 years) this is sometimes cited as the earliest known railway accident.

19th century

1810s

1813 
 February – United Kingdom – A 13-year-old boy named Jeff Bruce is killed whilst running alongside the Middleton Railway tracks. The Leeds Mercury reports that this would "operate as a warning to others".

1815 
 15 July – United Kingdom – Thirteen or sixteen people, mainly spectators, are killed, and 40 are injured by the boiler explosion of the experimental locomotive "Brunton's Mechanical Traveller" on the Newbottle Waggonway at Philadelphia, County Durham.

1818 
 28 February – United Kingdom – The driver is killed on the Middleton Railway in Hunslet, Leeds, West Yorkshire when Salamanca's boiler explodes, as a result of the force of the explosion, he was "carried, with great violence, into an adjoining field the distance of one hundred yards."  "This was the result of the driver tampering with the safety valves."

1820s

1821 
 5 December – United Kingdom – David Brook, a carpenter, is walking home from Leeds, Yorkshire along the Middleton Railway in a sleet storm when he is run over, with fatal results, by the steam engine of a coal train.

1827 
 United Kingdom – An unnamed woman from Eaglescliffe, County Durham, England (believed to have been a blind beggar woman) is "killed by the steam machine on the railway". This is said to be the first case of a woman being killed in a railway collision.

1828
 19 March – United Kingdom – The boiler of Stockton and Darlington Railway locomotive No. 5 explodes at Simpasture Junction, County Durham. One person is killed.
 July 1 – United Kingdom – The boiler of Stockton and Darlington railway locomotive Locomotion No. 1 explodes at  station, County Durham. One person is killed.

1829 
 4 September - United Kingdom - "A poor fellow incautiously placed himself in the way of a locomotive engine, which was driving waggons on the Liverpool and Manchester Railway in Salford, when the wheel went over one of his legs, which was literally cut off. He was carried to a surgeon's in the neighbourhood, but no effectual aid could be given to him, nor the bleeding staunched, and he died."

1830s

1830 
 15 September – United Kingdom – William Huskisson becomes the first widely reported passenger train death. During the ceremonial opening of the Liverpool and Manchester Railway, while standing on the track at Parkside, he is struck and fatally injured by the locomotive Rocket. (Locomotives did not yet have whistles.)

1831 
 8 February – United Kingdom – William Tewburn was a guard on an overnight goods train of the Liverpool and Manchester Railway, pulled by the Twin Sisters locomotive which arrived at Liverpool Road, in Manchester at 2am, where the unfortunate victim got aboard the tender unbeknownst to the engineer, who started moving the loco to take on coke and water, one of these short lurching trips caused the benumbed guard to lose his grip, and he fell under first the tender and then the locomotive, virtually cutting him in half.

 17 June – United States – After the pressure safety valve is tied down by the train's fireman, the locomotive Best Friend of Charleston suffers a boiler explosion at Charleston, South Carolina, killing him, scalding the engineer, and injuring three others. The locomotive was the first engine of the South Carolina Canal and Railroad Company.

 21 October – United Kingdom – On the Warrington & Newton Railway. Mr. Kitchingman had a garden that backed onto the railway at Dallam-brook. He was on the train with a friend and decided to jump out at his house, but was dragged under the wheels of the following coach, which mangled his leg, which had to be amputated. He later succumbed to his injuries and expired.

1833
 1 February – United Kingdom – At Parr Moss, west of Newton-le-Willows on the Liverpool & Manchester Railway, an eastbound train is stopped by the bursting of a fire tube in the locomotive.  Passengers get off to see what has happened, and some of them stand on the westbound track where the escaping steam blocks them from seeing (or being seen from) a train approaching from Bolton.  Four are run over by the westbound train, three of them killed instantly and the fourth reported as unlikely to survive.

 8 November – United States – Hightstown rail accident - The carriages of a Camden & Amboy passenger train derail in the New Jersey countryside between Spotswood and Hightstown when an axle breaks on a car due to an overheated journal. One car overturns, killing two people and injuring fifteen. Among the injured is Cornelius Vanderbilt, who will later head the New York Central Railroad. Uninjured in the coach ahead is former U.S. President John Quincy Adams, who continues on to the nation's capital the next day.

1834
 12 February – United Kingdom – A boiler explosion on a Middleton Colliery locomotive at Hunslet, Yorkshire kills one person.

1836 
 2 October – United States – A broken axle of a Cincinnati-bound train throws a woman and a child onto the track where they are both dragged and run over. The woman perishes, but the child manages to survive, though seriously injured.

 11 October – France – An employee of the line from Saint-Étienne to Lyon falls on a track and is decapitated by a train. The first train accident in France.

1837

 11 August – United States – The first head-on collision to result in passenger fatalities occurred on the Portsmouth and Roanoke Railroad near Suffolk, Virginia, when an eastbound lumber train coming down a grade at speed rounded a sharp curve and smashed into the morning passenger train from Portsmouth, Virginia. The first three of the thirteen stagecoach-style cars were smashed, killing three daughters of the prominent Ely family and injuring dozens of the 200 onboard returning from a steamboat cruise. An engraving depicting the moment of impact was published in Howland's Steamboat Disasters and Railroad Accidents in 1840.

1838
 7 August – United Kingdom – A ticket inspector, Thomas Port, falls from a moving London and Birmingham Railway passenger train at Harrow, Middlesex. Both his legs are amputated following the accident. 1838 Harrow rail accident 

 October – United Kingdom – A collision involving an experimental engine which Dionysius Lardner is allowed to operate on the Great Western Railway kills a "pupil" of Lardner's.

1839
 2 February – United Kingdom – Charlotte Carrad was killed by a train heading for Slough on the Great Western Railway, eight months after this section, the first of the GWR, had opened. She was trying to cross the track at Langley to pick turnip tops in a field. She'd seen the train, Hurricane, with three carriages, coming at about 18 miles an hour (29 km/h) but hurried down the public footpath to get across the track. She reached the further rail when the engine struck her on the shoulder. Her friend, who was with her, found her in the ditch on the other side of the track. There was a little sign of life, but she died a minute or two later, her neck vertebrae having been dislocated.

1840s

1840
 4 May – United States – One passenger was killed and several others injured when a lattice bridge over rain-swollen Catskill Creek collapsed under the weight of a Canajoharie and Catskill Railroad train en route from Catskill, New York, to Cairo, New York.
 7 August – United Kingdom – Howden rail crash, Five passengers are killed when a casting falls from a wagon and derails the carriages of a Hull and Selby Railway passenger train.
Two passengers are killed.
 September –  United Kingdom – An Eastern Counties Railway passenger train is in a rear-end collision with another at Old Ford, Essex. One person is killed.
 10 November –  United Kingdom – Two employees of the Birmingham and Gloucester Railway lose their lives when the boiler of the 2-2-0 steam locomotive Surprise explodes at Bromsgrove, Worcestershire.
 11 November –  United Kingdom – A York and North Midland Railway luggage train is in a rear-end collision with a passenger train at Taylor's Junction, Yorkshire. Two passengers are killed.

1841
 5 October – United States – Two Western Railroad passenger trains are in a head-on collision between Worcester, Massachusetts and Albany, New York. A conductor and a passenger are killed and seventeen passengers are injured.
 24 December – United Kingdom – Sonning Cutting railway accident: a Great Western Railway Paddington to Bristol train including goods wagons and open passenger wagons runs into a landslide in a cutting.  Nine passengers are killed and sixteen are injured, leading to calls for better protection for passengers.

1842

 8 May – France – Versailles rail accident: Following the King's fete celebrations at the Palace of Versailles, a train returning to Gare Montparnasse, Paris derails at Meudon, Hauts-de-Seine due to a broken axle on the leading locomotive. The wreckage catches fire, killing between 52 and 200 people, including the explorer Jules Dumont d'Urville.

1843
 6 January – United Kingdom – A collision between two North Midland Railway trains at Barnsley, Yorkshire killed one person. The only passenger to be killed travelling by train in the United Kingdom that year.
 United Kingdom – A locomotive boiler explosion on the Hartlepool Railway kills one person, a member of the public travelling illegally on the footplate.

1844
 1 May – United Kingdom – The boiler of Newcastle and Carlisle Railway locomotive Adelaide explodes at Carlisle, Cumberland. Two people are injured.
December 11 – United Kingdom – The boiler of South Eastern Railway locomotive No. 78 Forrester explodes as it hauls a freight train near , Surrey. Both crew are killed.

1845
 28 January – United Kingdom – The boiler of Newcastle and Carlisle Railway locomotive Venus exploded whilst it was hauling a freight train.
 28 January – United Kingdom – The boiler of Manchester and Leeds Railway locomotive No. 27 Irk explodes at Miles Platting, Lancashire.

1846
The driver is killed.
 9 July – United Kingdom – A Clarence Railway engine standing in a branch line of the Stockton and Darlington Railway suddenly began to move down the incline and collided with some waggons of another Clarence engine. Four men were crushed between the carriages and were severely injured. One died at the scene.
 23 November – United Kingdom – Elizabeth Coleman, aged eleven years, was killed on the Eastern Counties Railway. The deceased was, it appeared, endeavouring to cross the line at a point near the Roydon station where the Lockroad crosses the line on a level when she was struck by the buffer of a Cambridge train and killed upon the spot. The jury returned a verdict of "Accidental death."

1847

 24 May – United Kingdom – Dee bridge disaster - Five people are killed and nine are injured when the carriages of a -to- train falls  into the River Dee following the collapse of a bridge. One of the supporting cast-iron girders had cracked in the centre and given way. The locomotive and tender manage to reach the other side of the bridge, which was engineered by Robert Stephenson. The accident causes his reputation to be questioned. The collapse led to a re-evaluation of the use of cast iron in railway bridges; many bridges have to be demolished or reinforced.
 28 June – United Kingdom – A North Union Railway locomotive suffers a boiler explosion, injuring one person.

1848
 25 April – United Kingdom – The boiler of a North Midland Railway locomotive explodes at Normanton, Derbyshire, scalding three people.
The horse-box and cattle van had been pushed onto the main line by two porters to free a wagon turntable. Although the locomotive was undamaged, the side of the leading carriage was torn out.

1849
 Whitsuntide – United Kingdom – An East Lancashire Railway passenger train is in a rear-end collision with an excursion train. Despite efforts to protect its rear, another excursion train is in a rear-end collision with the passenger train.
 27 June – United Kingdom – The boiler of Great Western Railway locomotive Goliah explodes whilst it is hauling a freight train on the South Devon Railway at Plympton, Devon. One person is killed.

1850s

1850
 2 February – United Kingdom – The firebox of a York, Newcastle and Berwick Railway locomotive collapses whilst the locomotive is hauling a freight train near Darlington, County Durham. Two people are killed.
 26 March – United Kingdom – The boiler of a London and North Western Railway locomotive explodes at Wolverton, Buckinghamshire due to tampering of the safety valves. One person is injured.
 June – United Kingdom – The boiler of a Midland Railway locomotive explodes at Kegworth, Derbyshire.
 1 August – United Kingdom – When three Scottish Central Railway excursion trains are scheduled to arrive in rapid succession at Cowlairs, Lanarkshire, the second one stops on a crossover and must reverse to clear it; but although time interval working is in use, no one goes back to protect it and the third train crashes into it, killing five people.
Following this accident, The Great Western Railway provides trap points and scotch blocks at all sidings exiting on to main lines.
 United Kingdom – A Midland Railway train is in a rear-end collision with an excursion train at  station, Yorkshire because a signal is lit at night.
 United Kingdom – The boiler of a York and North Midland Railway locomotive explodes at Staddlethorpe, Yorkshire, derailing the locomotive. Two people are injured.

1851
 30 April – United Kingdom – Sutton Tunnel railway accident: A Birkenhead, Lancashire and Cheshire Junction Railway passenger train runs into the rear of another inside Sutton Tunnel, Cheshire. The train that was run into was pushing another in front of it; both had stalled. Six people are killed and "a great number" are injured.
 6 June – United Kingdom – A London, Brighton and South Coast Railway train is derailed on a bridge between Brighton and Lewes by a sleeper placed across a rail, killing five people.

1852
 12 July – United Kingdom – A 35-car school excursion train from Goole arrives at Burnley on the Lancashire and Yorkshire Railway, where it is far too long for the platform track. The engines are detached and the train left coasting slowly downhill into a long siding. As the station is understaffed, two friends of the staff have been asked to help out. One of them briefly lets go of a set of spring-loaded points, misrouting the train into the dead-end platform track, where it crashes into the buffers before it can be braked.  Of 800 people on board, four are killed.
 29 July – United Kingdom – On the London and North Western Railway, a locomotive is brought into Shrewsbury shed for a minor repair, but the steam is still engaged when the fire is dropped. After the engine is repaired and fired up, it is left unattended for 20 minutes at a shift change. It runs away onto the main line and  later collides with a standing train at Donnington, Shropshire, killing one passenger.
 3 August – United Kingdom – The ashpan of the locomotive falls off a Rugby-to-Birmingham train at Hampton on the London and North Western Railway, derailing a van and one coach, which collide with a train on the other track.  Two passengers are killed and several injured.
September 25 – United Kingdom – the boiler of an Eastern Counties Railway locomotive explodes.
Both engine crew are injured.
 25 November – United Kingdom – A Great Western Railway train hauled by locomotive Lynx is derailed at Gatcombe, Gloucestershire.

1853 
 6 January – United States – A train carrying President-elect Franklin Pierce, his wife Jane and their son Benjamin derailed and toppled off an embankment near Andover, MA. Franklin and Jane suffered minor injuries, but their son Benjamin was killed.
 4 March – United States – A train carrying emigrants near Mount Union, Pennsylvania, is rear-ended by a mail train; boilers rupture, scalding seven people to death and having the highest death toll  in the United States in that time. The engineer of the mail train was reportedly asleep when the collision occurred.
 4 March – United Kingdom – A Lancashire and Yorkshire Railway train derails on a deteriorated section of track near Dixon Fold, killing the driver and five passengers.

 6 March – United States – Norwalk rail accident - The first major American railroad bridge disaster occurs when a New Haven Railroad engineer neglects to check for an open drawbridge signal. The locomotive and four-and-one-half cars run through the open drawbridge and plunge into the Norwalk River, Connecticut. Forty-six passengers are crushed to death or drowned, and about 30 others are severely injured.
 6 March – United Kingdom – The boiler of a London and North Western Railway locomotive explodes at Longsight, Lancashire. Six people are killed, and the engine shed is severely damaged.
 25 April – United States – A collision near Chicago results in the deaths of 15.
 9 May – United States – A cornfield meet in the New Jersey Meadowlands results in the deaths of two people. One of the engineers was not forewarned about the change in time schedule which resulted in this.
 12 August – 1853 Providence and Worcester head-on collision – United States – Two Providence and Worcester Railroad passenger trains are in a head-on collision at Valley Falls, Rhode Island. Thirteen people are killed and 50 are injured. This is believed to be the earliest wreck photographed, with the daguerreotype taken by a Mr. L. Wright of Pawtucket forming the basis for an engraving a fortnight later in The Illustrated News of New York.
 September – United Kingdom – An Eastern Counties Railway freight train comes to a halt near , Suffolk due to a locomotive failure. The driver of another freight train deliberately ignores a red signal and consequently his train is in a rear-end collision with the first train.
The train is run into by a following freight train due to the failure of the guard to act to protect the line to the rear of the broken-down train. Eighteen people are killed.
 United Kingdom – The boiler of a Midland Railway locomotive explodes near Bristol, Gloucestershire whilst the locomotive is hauling a freight train.

1854
 24 August – United Kingdom – A South Eastern Railway excursion train is in a rear-end collision with a light engine at Windmill Bridge, Croydon, Surrey. Three passengers are killed.
 27 October – Canada – A Great Western Railway passenger train runs into the rear of a gravel train at Baptiste Creek, Ontario. Fifty-two people are killed, and at least 48 people are injured.

1855
 29 August – United States – A southbound Camden and Amboy Rail Road passenger train, backing up on a single track near Burlington, New Jersey, to make room for a northbound express, hit a horse-drawn carriage. The rearmost passenger car derailed, and the succeeding cars crashed into it, derailed, and plunged into a ditch. All four passengers' cars were demolished. Twenty-four people died, and between 65 and 100 were injured.
 1 November – United States – Gasconade Bridge train disaster - A bridge over the Gasconade River at Gasconade, Missouri collapses under a Pacific Railroad excursion train during the celebrations of the line's opening. Thirty-one people are killed, and hundreds are seriously injured.
Four people are killed, and many are injured. 
 15 December – United States – The boiler of the New York Central Railroad locomotive Dewitt Clinton explodes, killing the engineer and fireman.
 United Kingdom – A South Eastern Railway train is derailed at Bricklayers' Arms Junction, Surrey, when a pointsman moves a set of points under it.

1856

 17 July – United States – Great Train Wreck of 1856 - Two North Pennsylvania Railroad passenger trains are in a head-on collision at Camp Hill, Pennsylvania, including a train on an excursion from a Sunday school at St. Michael's Catholic Parish in Philadelphia. Fifty-nine people are killed in the crash and subsequent fire, with over 100 people injured, some of whom consequently die. The engineer of one of the trains commits suicide the same day, although he is later absolved of any responsibility.

1857
 12 March – Canada – Desjardins Canal disaster: A bridge over the Desjardins Canal collapses when the axle of a Great Western Railway passenger train from Toronto to Hamilton breaks as the train is passing across it. Fifty-nine people are killed by trauma or drowning after being thrown into the frozen canal.
Eleven people are killed, and 30 are injured.

1858
 6 May – United Kingdom – A passenger train from Plymouth on the just-opened Cornwall Railway derails just before the Grove Viaduct near St Germans and the engine and two cars plunged toward the water.  Three railwaymen are killed.
 11 May – United States – A bridge some 3 miles (4.8 km) from Utica, New York gave way when two trains, including a New York Central, express bound for Cincinnati, passed over it. Nine passengers died, including some who drowned, and fifty were injured.
 15 May – United States – A Lafayette & Indianapolis Railroad train accident on a 120-foot (37-metre) bridge over Potato Creek, about 17 miles (27 km) southeast of Lafayette near Colfax, IN. The engineer, Jacob Beitinger (Beidinger), the fireman, Patrick Maloney (Moloney), and conductor James W. Irwin were killed.
Three people are killed.
 11 August – United Kingdom – A passenger train runs into the buffers ar  station, Kent. Twenty people are injured.

 23 August – United Kingdom – Round Oak rail accident - An Oxford, Worcester and Wolverhampton Railway passenger train becomes divided following a coupling failure. The rear portion runs away and collides with a following passenger train at  station, Stourbridge, Worcestershire. Fourteen people are killed. There are 50 serious injuries and 170 minor injuries.
 6 September – France – On the Chemin de fer de Paris à Saint-Germain, a 10-car atmospheric railway train is returning by gravity with about 300 festival-goers from Saint-Germain-en-Laye to Le Vésinet, where it will couple to a steam locomotive to continue to Paris. Due to a combination of errors, it runs away and crashes into the locomotive's tender. A crew member and two passengers are killed, and at least 40 people are injured.

1859

 28 June – United States – South Bend train wreck - At South Bend, Indiana, the Springbrook Bridge collapses as a Michigan Southern Railroad express passenger train passes over it. Forty-two people are killed and 50 are injured.
 August – United Kingdom – An axle of the engine of the London, Tilbury and Southend Railway fractures at Stanford-le-Hope, Essex. One male passenger is killed.

1860s

1860
 20 February – United Kingdom – The tyre of an Eastern Counties Railway locomotive breaks as it hauls a passenger train through Tottenham station. The train is derailed, killing seven people.
 16 May – United States – On the Florida, Atlantic and Gulf Central Railroad about thirteen miles (21 km) west of Jacksonville, Florida, a train encountered a drove of cattle which threw the train off track. Lumber, logs trunks and passengers were "heaped up in almost inextricable confusion." Nearly every person on board was more or less injured. Three people were killed in the crash.
 6 September – United Kingdom – Helmshore rail accident - A Lancashire and Yorkshire Railway excursion train becomes divided at Helmshore, Lancashire. Sixteen carriages run away and crash into the following train. Eleven people are killed.
 26 September – United Kingdom – Bull bridge accident - A cast iron bridge collapses under a Midland Railway freight train at Bullbridge, Derbyshire.
 16 November – United Kingdom – A London and North Western Railway mail train overruns signals and crashes into the rear of a cattle train at Atherstone, Warwickshire. Ten people are killed; mostly Irish drovers asleep in the brake van at the rear of the cattle train.

1861
One person was killed.

 11 June – United Kingdom – Wootton bridge collapse: A cast iron bridge near Kenilworth, Warwickshire collapses under a London and North Western Railway freight train. Both crew of the locomotive are killed.
Luckily no passengers are even injured, but of the railwaymen and postal crew on board, one is killed and three are injured.
 25 August – United Kingdom – Clayton Tunnel rail crash: A London, Brighton and South Coast Railway excursion train crashes into the rear of another inside the Clayton Tunnel, West Sussex due to a combination of driver's, signalman's and operating errors. Twenty-three people are killed, and 176 are injured in what was then the deadliest railway accident in the United Kingdom. 
 29 August - United Kingdom - A South Durham and Lancashire Union Railway excursion train returning from Windermere to Darlington derails three miles (4.8 km) west of Bowes, injuring a number of passengers. The injured driver and fireman are trapped beneath the locomotive for several hours till rescued. The driver died on September 8, 1861, from his injuries. 
 2 September – United Kingdom – Kentish Town rail accident: A North London Railway excursion train collides with a London and North Western Railway freight train at Kentish Town, Middlesex due to a signalman's error. Sixteen people are killed, and 317 are injured. 
 3 September – United States – Platte Bridge Railroad Tragedy: A Hannibal and St. Joseph Railroad train is wrecked after bushwhackers sabotage the supports of a bridge over the Platte River in Missouri. At least seventeen people are killed, and about 100 are injured.
 December – United Kingdom – A London, Chatham and Dover Railway train hauled by locomotive Eclipse is derailed at Teynham, Kent due to the elongation of the gap at a rail joint in cold weather.

1862
Three people are killed.

 13 October – United Kingdom – Winchburgh rail crash - Two Edinburgh and Glasgow Railway passenger trains are in a head-on collision at Winchburgh, Linlithgowshire due to a pointsman's error. Fifteen people are killed and 35 are injured.

1863
 19 February – United States – Chunky Creek train wreck: The Hercules on the Southern Rail Road crashes into the Chunky River in Newton County, Mississippi. The train was headed for Vicksburg where Confederate forces were in need of reinforcements. The Hercules derailed on a damaged bridge and fell into the cold, murky depths. At least 40 passengers were killed. Some victims were rescued by soldiers from the 1st Choctaw Battalion who were camped nearby.

1864
 5 May – United Kingdom – At Colne on the Midland Railway, a 0-6-0 engine being prepared to work a goods train to Leeds suffers a boiler explosion, killing the driver and badly injuring the fireman.
 9 May – United Kingdom – At Bishop's Road station on the Metropolitan Railway — a 0-6-0 locomotive borrowed from the Great Northern Railway suffers a boiler explosion.  Nobody is killed but the station suffers major damage and injuries extend to a passenger in another train two tracks away.

 29 June – Canada – St-Hilaire train disaster - An immigrant train fails to stop at a danger signal and attempts to cross an open swing bridge and falls into the Richelieu River at Beloeil, Quebec. Ninety-nine people are killed and 100 are injured. , this still stands as the rail accident with the largest death toll in Canada.
 15 July – United States – Shohola train wreck - An Erie Railroad passenger train carrying Confederate prisoners-of-war is in a head-on collision with a coal train near Shohola Township, Pennsylvania due to a dispatcher's error. Between 60 and 72 people are killed (official toll is 65 killed).
 16 August – United States – An Erie Railroad freight train runs into the rear of a passenger train between Turner's Station and Sloatsburg, New York. A third train runs into the wreckage. Seven people are killed.
 21 September – United States – A Pennsylvania Railroad passenger train runs into the rear of a stopped freight train at Thompsontown, Pennsylvania. The wreckage then catches fire. At least six people are killed and thirteen are injured.
 16 December – United Kingdom – A South Eastern Railway ballast train becomes divided inside Blackheath Tunnel, Kent. An express passenger train runs into the rear portion, killing five people, with two others dying later and many injured.

1865
 12 May – United Kingdom – An accident occurred on the Irish North Western railway near Enniskillen. A goods train left Derry and ran off the rails. The engine driver, J. McCabe, and the stoker, C. Craven, were killed. Some bullocks in a waggon were also killed.'
 7 June – United Kingdom – Rednal rail crash - A Great Western Railway excursion train is derailed at Rednal, Shropshire due to excessive speed on track under maintenance. Thirteen people are killed and 30 are injured.

 9 June – United Kingdom – Staplehurst rail crash - A South Eastern Railway boat train is derailed on a bridge over the River Beult at Staplehurst, Kent after track workers misread a timetable and remove a rail. Ten people are killed, and 49 are injured. Charles Dickens is amongst the survivors.

1866
 30 April – United Kingdom – A South Eastern Railway passenger train collides with some goods wagons at Caterham Junction, Surrey due to a signalman's error. Four people are killed.
 10 June – United Kingdom – Welwyn Tunnel rail crash: A Great Northern Railway freight train is stopped in Welwyn North Tunnel due to a burst fire tube.  A Midland Railway freight train following it in the same direction crashes into it, and a third freight train going the other way crashes into the wreckage.  All three trains are totally destroyed by fire, but the only deaths are two of the crew members.
 27 August – United States – A boiler explosion on the Petaluma and Haystack Railroad at Petaluma Station kills the engineer and three others and wrecks the railroad's only locomotive.
 19 December – United Kingdom – During the construction of the new Smithfield Market building adjacent to an open-air section of the Metropolitan Railway in London, a girder falls onto a passing train and 3 passengers are killed. This is the first fatal accident on an underground train.

1867
 29 June – United Kingdom – Warrington rail crash - A London and North Western Railway passenger train is in collision with a freight train at Walton Junction, Warrington, Cheshire due to a signalman's error. Eight people are killed and 70 are injured. Lack of interlocking between signals and points is a major contributory factor in the accident.

 9 August – Ireland – A bridge collapses under a passenger train at Bray, County Wicklow. Four people are killed and twelve are injured.
 18 December – United States – Angola Horror – The Buffalo-bound New York Express of the Lake Shore and Michigan Southern derails its last coach, and it plunges off a truss bridge into Big Sister Creek just after passing Angola, New York. The next car is also pulled from the track and rolls down the far embankment. Stoves set both coaches on fire and 49 are killed. The cars were relatively easy to derail because they were "compromise cars" designed to run on slightly different track gauges, a practice soon afterwards prohibited.

1868
 1 February – United Kingdom – An embankment on the approach to the Caersws Railway Bridge on the Cambrian Railway is washed out by flooding, derailing a mail and goods train running from Shrewsbury to Aberystwyth.  The two enginemen are killed.
During shunting operations, six wagons run away downhill towards , where they collide with an express passenger train. Five of the wagons are carrying paraffin, which explodes and sets the wreck of the passenger train on fire. Thirty-three people are killed, the driver of the express is severely burned.
 5 November – United Kingdom – Great Western Railway locomotive Rob Roy crashes into the rear of a cattle train at Awse Junction, near Newnham, Gloucestershire and is derailed.

1869
 23 April – United States – Hollis, New York: A Long Island Rail Road passenger train is derailed by a broken rail. The rail curls into a "snakehead" and rips out the bottom of one of the cars. Six people are killed, and fourteen injured.
 14 November – United States – San Leandro, California: An errant switchman and poor visibility due to fog led to a head-on collision between an eastbound passenger train from Oakland, with a sleeper car, on the Western Pacific Railroad and an Alameda-bound Alameda Railroad passenger train. Among the fourteen killed was Judge Alexander W. Baldwin of the US District Court of Nevada.

1870s

1870
 21 June – United Kingdom – Newark rail crash: The axle of a wagon of a Midland Railway freight train breaks at Newark, Nottinghamshire, derailing the train. The derailed wagons foul an adjacent line. An excursion train collides with the debris. Eighteen people are killed and 40 are injured.
 14 September – United Kingdom – Tamworth rail crash: A London and North Western Railway mail train is diverted into a siding at  station, Staffordshire due to a signalman's error. The train crashes through the buffers and ends up in the River Anker. Three people are killed.
 26 November – United Kingdom – An express train crashed into a stationary freight train at Harrow and Wealdstone station on the London and North Western Railway, killing eight people.
 6 December – United Kingdom – A collision between two North Eastern Railway trains at Brockley Whins claims five lives and injures 37 people. The cause is a pointsman's error made possible by the lack of interlocking between points and signals.
Fifteen people are killed, and 59 are injured.
 United Kingdom – A North Eastern Railway freight train overruns signals and is in collision with a London and North Western Railway mail train at St. Nicholas Crossing, Carlisle, Cumberland. Five people are killed, many more are injured. The driver of the North Eastern Railway train was intoxicated.

1871
 6 February – United States – A freight train on the Hudson River Railroad, carrying both crude and refined oil, suffers a broken axle. Because the crew have not threaded the required rope for communication from caboose to locomotive, the engineer is unaware, and the train keeps moving until it derails at the Wappinger Creek drawbridge, New Hamburg, New York. They and the drawbridge tender try to warn the following Pacific Express passenger train, but they are not in time, and the collision and resulting fire kill 22 people.

 9 August – United States – A bridge collapses under a Maine Central Railroad Company passenger train at Bangor, Maine. One person is killed and 30 are injured.
 26 August – United States – Great Revere train wreck of 1871: A series of dispatching errors allow the Eastern Railroad's Portland Express to run into the rear of a stalled local train at Revere, Massachusetts. The wreckage catches fire; 29 people are killed and 57 are injured. Several prominent Boston citizens are killed, bringing much national publicity to the accident.

1872
 2 October – United Kingdom – Kirtlebridge rail crash - A Caledonian Railway express passenger train collides with a freight train performing shunting operations at Kirtlebridge, Dumfriesshire. Twelve people are killed and fifteen are injured.
 24 December – United States – Two passenger cars of a Pennsylvania Railroad passenger train fall off a bridge in Portland, New York due to a "broken flange on the tender". Thirty people are killed and at least eighteen are injured.

1873 
 30 March – United Kingdom – A Great Northern Railway excursion train collides with two carriages at Bourne, Lincolnshire. No one was seriously injured, but the carriages and crossing gates were destroyed.

 19 April – United States – A passenger train is derailed at Wood River Junction, Meadow Brook, Rhode Island. Nine passengers are killed.
 6 May – Austria-Hungary – A passenger train is derailed at Budapest-Nyugati Railway Terminal. 26 people are killed.
 2 August – United Kingdom – Wigan rail crash - A London and North Western Railway passenger train derails at Wigan North Western station, possibly due to excessive speed over facing points. Thirteen people are killed and 30 are injured.
 12 August - Italy - A Società per le strade ferrate romane passenger train in service between Rome and Florence derails near the town of Orte (Lazio) after hitting two cattle standing on the tracks. Two people are killed and more than 40 injured.
 2 December – United Kingdom – At Menheniot on the Cornwall Railway, a porter-signalman named Pratt instructs a down goods train to proceed by calling out "Right away, Dick" to its guard, Richard Wills. Unfortunately, an up goods train is also at the station and its guard, Richard Scantlebury, thinks the instruction is for him; by the time Pratt realizes this, Scantlebury has already told his driver to start. Their train collides with another down goods before reaching St Germans, injuring several crewmen and killing one.

1874 
 27 January – United Kingdom – Bo'ness Junction rail crash - A North British Railway express passenger train collides with a freight train at Bo'ness Junction, Stirlingshire. Sixteen people are killed and 28 are injured.
 10 September – United Kingdom – Thorpe rail accident - Two Great Eastern Railway passenger trains are in a head-on collision at Thorpe St. Andrew, Norfolk, due to irregular dispatching procedures. Twenty-five people are killed and more than 100 injured. The accident leads directly to the introduction of automatic control systems to manage traffic on single-track railways. 

 24 December – United Kingdom – Shipton-on-Cherwell train crash - A Great Western Railway passenger train is derailed by a fractured wheel at Shipton-on-Cherwell, Oxfordshire. Thirty-four people are killed, and 69 are injured. Poor communications and the lack of continuous brakes exacerbate the disaster.

1875
 6 July – Chile – A bridge collapses beneath the overnight train between Valparaíso and Santiago in Chile, killing nine people.
 28 August – United Kingdom – A passenger train overruns signals and is in a rear-end collision with an excursion train at Kildwick, Yorkshire. Seven people are killed and 39 are injured.

 15 November – Sweden – Lagerlunda rail accident - Unclear signalling leads to a head-on-collision between two passenger trains near Lagerlunda, Östergötland. Nine people are killed.

1876 
 21 January – United Kingdom – Abbots Ripton rail accident: A Great Northern Railway express passenger train passes a signal jammed in the clear position during a blizzard and is in a rear-end collision with a freight train at Abbots Ripton, Huntingdonshire, and a train in the other direction then collides with the wreckage. Thirteen passengers are killed and 59 people are injured.
 14 April – United Kingdom – A Great Northern Railway express train runs into a mail train at Corby, Northamptonshire because signals are jammed in a clear position in a blizzard.
 16 June – United States – A trestle bridge collapses under a Blue Ridge Railroad train bound from Belton, South Carolina, to Anderson Court House, South Carolina. All five people on board are killed.
 7 August – United Kingdom – Radstock rail accident - A variety of errors lead to two Somerset and Dorset Joint Railway passenger trains being involved in a head-on collision at Radstock, Somerset. Fifteen passengers are killed.
 23 December – United Kingdom – A Great Northern Railway express train overruns signals and crashes into a number of wagons at Arlesley Sidings, Bedfordshire. Six people are killed.

 29 December – United States – Ashtabula River railroad disaster: A bridge collapses under a Lake Shore and Michigan Southern Railway passenger train at Ashtabula, Ohio. A fire is started by the car stoves. Dozens of people are killed, but sources disagree as to how many-perhaps as many as 92. The famous hymn-writer Philip Bliss and his wife are believed to be amongst an estimated 19-25 unidentified victims.

1877
 27 March - United States - A train on the Jackson, Lansing, and Saginaw Railroad, fatally injures one.
 4 October – United States – A mixed train of the Pickering Valley Railroad falls from a washed-out embankment near Kimberton, Pennsylvania, killing seven and injuring dozens.

1878
 11 January - United Kingdom - Great Northern Railway - The Flying Scotsman is in a collision with a freight train at Welwyn Garden City, Hertfordshire, after which a local passenger train collides with the wreckage.
 21 May – United States – A Kansas Pacific R.R. Freight train is caught in a bridge washout at Kiowa Creek, Colorado; 3 killed.
Five people are killed.
 8 October – United States – Wollaston disaster - A train in Quincy, Massachusetts carrying over 1,000 passengers runs over an open switch resulting a serious derailment.

1879
 15 January – United Kingdom – Two hounds from the Pytchley Hunt were killed and a number injured while chasing a fox near the Kilsby Tunnel on the London and Birmingham Railway, when a train ran through the pack.
 18 (or 25) January – Belgium – Two passengers and the engine driver were killed when the express train from Brussels to Lille and Calais left the line at Bassilly.
 22 January – United Kingdom – A heavy goods train from Glasgow was travelling too fast on the Tay Rail Bridge and a number of carriages left the track when the guard applied the brakes. The same bridge would be the scene of a much worse accident less than a year later (see below).
 22 January – United Kingdom – Three carriages left the line after a collision between trains from Farringdon Street and Aldersgate Street at Snow-Hill, on the London, Chatham and Dover Railway.
 5 (or 12) February – United Kingdom – A cattle train ran into a ballast train near Widnes Junction on the London and North Western Railway. The driver and stoker jumped out as the cattle train engine ran down the embankment.
 4 April – United Kingdom – A goods train ran off the Highland Railway line, near Perth, destroying  of track.
 17 May – United Kingdom – An express train from Glasgow came off the line when it collided with a goods train near Dunfermline railway station on the North British Railway. The driver of the express died.
 13 June – United Kingdom – A train carrying show cattle from the Royal Cornwall Show was hit by a Plymouth-to-Penzance goods train at Truro railway station. One van was ″smashed to pieces″, there was one minor injury to the goods train driver, and none to the cattle.
 26 July – United Kingdom – Lancashire and Yorkshire Railway. The 7:30 train for Warrington failed to stop and hit a Rainford train at Wigan Station. Several third-class carriages were knocked off the rails.
 July/August – France – An accident between Nancy and Paris killed five people and injured eleven.
 16 August – France – A passenger train and a goods train collided near Montséret killing fifteen and injuring thirty-six.
 29 August – United Kingdom – The Scottish mail train derailed between Hendon and Mill Hill due to the track subsiding following heavy rain. The driver and fireman both severely injured.
 24 September – United Kingdom – A Great Western Railway train from Plymouth to Tavistock derailed outside Marsh Mills railway station.
The accident was due to the incorrect setting of its safety valves. One person killed and two injured.
 12 October – United Kingdom – The 10:10 am passenger train from Derby ran into seven empty carriages at Nottingham station, resulting in eight injured and considerable damage to the rolling stock.
 1 December – United Kingdom – North Liverpool Extension Line. The train from Walton hit an engine at Brunswick Dock, Liverpool. One man killed and four injured.

 28 December – United Kingdom – Tay Bridge disaster - The Tay Rail Bridge collapses in a violent storm while a North British Railway passenger train is crossing it. There were no survivors, with the total estimated at seventy-five lives lost, although the real total was fifty-nine. The subsequent investigation concludes that "the bridge was badly designed, badly constructed and badly maintained" and lays the major blame on the designer, Sir Thomas Bouch. William McGonagall produces his epic poem The Tay Bridge Disaster to commemorate the event. The disaster shocks engineers into creating an improved crossing both on the Tay, as well as the famous Forth Bridge.

See also 
 London Underground accidents
Rail Transport

References

Sources

External links
 

Rail accidents 1880
19th-century railway accidents